3255 Tholen, provisional designation , is a stony asteroid, Mars-crosser and relatively fast rotator, that measures approximately  in diameter. It was discovered on 2 September 1980, by American astronomer Edward Bowell at Lowell's Anderson Mesa Station in Flagstaff, Arizona. The S-type asteroid has a rotation period of 2.95 hours. It was later named after American astronomer David Tholen.

Orbit and classification 

Tholen is a Mars-crossing asteroid, crossing the orbit of Mars at 1.666 AU. Members of this dynamically unstable group are located between the main belt and near-Earth populations. It orbits the Sun at a distance of 1.5–3.2 AU once every 3 years and 8 months (1,334 days; semi-major axis of 2.37 AU). Its orbit has an eccentricity of 0.36 and an inclination of 21° with respect to the ecliptic.

Naming 

This minor planet was named after David J. Tholen (born 1955), a discoverer of minor planets and planetary scientist at the Institute for Astronomy of the University of Hawaii, known for his eight-color taxonomic scheme on minor planets. The official naming citation was published by the Minor Planet Center on 14 April 1987.

Physical characteristics 

In the SMASS classification, as well as in the Bus–DeMeo classification, Tholen is a common S-type asteroid.

Diameter and albedo 

According to the space-based survey carried out by the Japanese Akari satellite and NASA's NEOWISE mission, the asteroid measures between 4.0 and 6.8 kilometers in diameter, and its surface has an albedo of 0.14 and 0.34, respectively, while the Collaborative Asteroid Lightcurve Link assumes a standard albedo for stony asteroids of 0.20 and derives a diameter of 5.1 kilometers with an absolute magnitude of 13.84.

Rotation period 

Several rotational lightcurves were obtained for this asteroid from photometric observations.

In September 2013, Italian astronomer Andrea Ferrero at the Bigmuskie Observatory  in Mombercelli, Italy, derived a rotation period of  hours with a brightness variation of 0.11 in magnitude, while two month later, in November 2013, astronomer Brian A. Skiff obtained two lightcurves that both gave a period of 2.95 and an amplitude of 0.24 and 0.28 in magnitude, respectively.

Notes

References

External links 
 Asteroid Lightcurve Database (LCDB), query form (info )
 Dictionary of Minor Planet Names, Google books
 Asteroids and comets rotation curves, CdR – Observatoire de Genève, Raoul Behrend
 Discovery Circumstances: Numbered Minor Planets (1)-(5000) – Minor Planet Center
 
 

003255
Discoveries by Edward L. G. Bowell
Named minor planets
003255
19800902